The Shanghai SH760 is a car produced in China from 1965 to 1991 primarily for government officials not important enough to warrant a FAW Hongqi and as a taxi. The design was based on the Mercedes-Benz 220S (W180) from 1954, with modified front and rear styling to resemble an American Packard of the same era such as the Patrician 1955 model.

Originally built by the Shanghai City Agricultural Machinery Manufacturing Company, this became STAC (Shanghai Tractor and Automobile Corporation) in April 1969. The company changed its name to SATIC (Shanghai Automobile and Tractor Industry Corporation) in the mid-1980s and became SAIC in 1990.

Unlike Beijing-controlled FAW and SAW (now Dongfeng Motor), STAC was owned directly by the city of Shanghai.

Development
The Shanghai Automobile assembly line produced its first prototype on 28 September 1958, called Fenghuang (meaning Phoenix in English). It was based on a 1957 FSO Warszawa and was powered by a 2.1 liter Nanjing NJ050 four-cylinder engine, itself a copy of the Soviet Pobeda M20 engine. The Phoenix models are distinguished by round headlights and fins to the rear. The front end resembled the American 1955-1956 Packard Patrician and Packard Clipper models.

A second Phoenix prototype was produced in January 1959, now with quad headlights. The styling was similar to the 1958 Plymouth.

The third prototype, named the Jiaotong, was produced in November 1959 and returned to dual headlights. The grille design featured two dragons incorporated into it, as well as new hood ornaments. This prototype was probably powered by a V8 engine.

The final Phoenix prototype was now based on the Mercedes-Benz 220 (W180) instead of the FSO Warszawa, otherwise the styling was similar to the first prototype. In the summer of 1959, the production version of the Phoenix was released. Very few Phoenix models were produced.

In December 1964, a modified Phoenix changed its name to Shanghai SH760, and was in full production. A mere fifty cars were built in 1964, but by the mid-seventies factory capacity stood at 5,000 per annum. The SH760 was powered by the Jinfeng (Golden Phoenix) 680Q, a 2.2 litre straight-six engine developing  and coupled with a four-speed manual gearbox. As with the basis of the bodywork, this was a copy of 1950s Mercedes-Benz mechanicals, although the engine was OHV instead of OHC. Construction was by hand, with old-fashioned methods and on a small scale.

A 1985 visitor described the process as chaotic, with many body parts rusting before they were even painted - but since the metal was so thick, this was not an issue, as they would still easily outlast the engine and transmission.

Variants

SH760A
In 1974, the SH760A was released. This was a complete redesign of the SH760 with more modern front and rear end design replacing the 1950s styling of the SH760, although the center section was still based from the same Mercedes-Benz model. The powertrain was carried over from the SH760. Air conditioning was developed and approved in 1983, but was not available until 1988 with the SH760B. 

Production continued until around 1989 with some 49,000 units produced.

SH760B
Development on a SH760A replacement, the SH760B, was complete by 1980, but the car and its new engine were not available until 1988, after passing evaluation tests in 1987. The SH760B was powered by the Jinfeng 682Q, a new enlarged 2.3 liter version of the 680Q producing 100 horsepower. The model is sold with the SH760A.

Two versions were available; one was basically the SH760A but with a black plastic grille while the other featured trim, bumpers, taillights (somewhat modified), steering wheel, mirrors, wheels, and some interior trim pieces straight from the Volkswagen Santana, even though this was in direct contradiction to Shanghai's contract with Volkswagen. The SH760B was produced until 1989 alongside the SH760A.

SH760C/D
The SH760 is the prototype of a two-door pickup and the SH760D is a prototype of a four-door pickup.

SH7221/SH7231
In 1989, China's automotive designation system changed and the SH760A and SH760B were redesignated as SH7221 and SH7231, respectively, but otherwise remained identical to the previous models.

Production ended on 25 November 1991, after a total production run of 79,526 cars. Production peaked in 1984 at around 6,000 units.

The SH760 was used as a basis for a four-door convertible, a three-door pickup truck from 1991 to 1994, and a five-door station wagon. Few of these mostly handmade derivatives were produced.

Proposed replacements
A replacement for the SH760 was proposed as early as 1966 with the SH763, followed by the SH762 in 1967. Both models used the same engine as the SH760. In 1974, the SH771 was developed as another possible replacement for the SH760.

The SH771 was based on a 1972 Mercedes-Benz S-Class (W116) with different front and rear end styling, although the rear end resembled the W116. 

Unlike the SH760, the SH771 used the 5.6 liter V8 from the Hongqi Red Flag CA770. Never produced, only 30 SH771s were built, and were used for testing until 1978. Beijing did not approve of full-scale production for the SH771.

A third potential SH760 replacement, the SH761, was developed in the 1980s as a convertible parade car.

References
Works cited

Citations

Cars of China
SAIC Motor vehicles
Executive cars
Cars introduced in 1964